Austroblechnum divergens, synonyms including Blechnum divergens, Blechnum rimbachii and Blechnum floresii, is a species of fern in the family Blechnaceae.

Austroblechnum divergens in its broader circumscription is native from Mexico to southern Brazil.

Some sources treat the taxon known by the synonym Blechnum rimbachii as a distinct species; if so, it is endemic to Azuay Province, Ecuador (found 2,000 m above sea level), and is only known from an early 20th century collection. Its natural habitat is subtropical or tropical moist montane forests. It is threatened by habitat loss for agriculture.

Similarly, the synonym Blechnum floresii is regarded as representing a separate species by some sources. If so, it is endemic to Ecuador, where it is known from only two locations in Pichincha Province. It grows in coastal forest habitat and the forests of the low Andes. It is threatened by habitat loss.

Sources

Blechnaceae
Flora of Mexico
Flora of Central America
Flora of South America
Taxonomy articles created by Polbot
Taxobox binomials not recognized by IUCN